Westover is an unincorporated community in Jones County, in the U.S. state of South Dakota.

History
A post office called Westover was in operation between 1891 and 1957. According to the Federal Writers' Project, the origin of the name Westover is obscure.

References

Unincorporated communities in Jones County, South Dakota
Unincorporated communities in South Dakota